The Georgia Film Critics Association (GAFCA) is an organization of professional film critics from the U.S. state of Georgia. Inclusion is open to film critics throughout the entire state of Georgia, although the majority of members are concentrated in the Metro Atlanta area. GAFCA members represent the reviewing press through online, radio, television, or print media.

Overview
The Georgia Film Critics Association was founded in 2011, and is the first film critic group in the state of Georgia. As of 2023, GAFCA comprises 48 members. Awards are given annually in 17 categories. A special award, the Oglethorpe Award for Excellence in Georgia Cinema, is bestowed upon a film or short film that was produced in Georgia. The Oglethorpe Award is credited to the winning film's director and writer.

Each January, GAFCA votes on their end-of-year awards for films released in the previous calendar year. Nomination ballots are typically due on the first Saturday in January, with nominations announced the following Monday and winners announced that Friday.

In 2022, GAFCA released the runners-up alongside winners for the first time in their history.

Awards Categories
 Best Actor
 Best Actress
 Best Adapted Screenplay
 Best Animated Film
 Best Cinematography
 Best Director
 Best Documentary
 Best Ensemble
 Best International Film (formerly Foreign Film or Foreign Language Film)
 Best Original Score
 Best Original Screenplay
 Best Original Song
 Best Picture
 Best Production Design (formerly Art Direction)
 Best Supporting Actor
 Best Supporting Actress
 Breakthrough Award
 Oglethorpe Award for Excellence in Georgia Cinema

Awards History

Top Category Winner History

Breakthrough Award Winner History
The Breakthrough Award is credited to an individual only and not to a film.

Danielle Deadwyler and Stephanie Hsu tied for the Breakthrough Award in 2022, marking the first tie in Georgia Film Critics history in any category.

Multiple award winners

Films with multiple awards
 6 awards:
 Everything Everywhere All at Once (2022): Best Film, Best Director, Best Actress, Best Supporting Actor, Best Supporting Actress, Best Original Screenplay
 The Tree of Life (2011): Best Film, Best Director, Best Supporting Actor, Best Supporting Actress, Best Cinematography, Best Art Direction
 5 awards:
 La La Land (2016): Best Director, Best Original Screenplay, Best Production Design, Best Original Score, Best Original Song
 Licorice Pizza (2021): Best Picture, Best Actress, Best Supporting Actor, Best Original Screenplay, Best Ensemble 
 Moonlight (2016): Best Film, Best Supporting Actor, Best Adapted Screenplay, Best Cinematography, Best Ensemble
 4 awards:
 Lady Bird (2017): Best Film, Best Director, Best Actress, Best Supporting Actress
 Mad Max: Fury Road (2015): Best Film, Best Director, Best Cinematography, Best Production Design
 Nomadland (2020): Best Film, Best Director, Best Adapted Screenplay, Best Cinematography
 Parasite (2019): Best Film, Best Director, Best Original Screenplay, Best Foreign Language Film
 Silver Linings Playbook (2012): Best Film, Best Actress, Best Adapted Screenplay, Best Ensemble
 3 awards:
 1917 (2019): Best Cinematography, Best Production Design, Best Original Score
 Dune (2021): Best Cinematography, Best Production Design, Best Original Score
 The Favourite (2018): Best Supporting Actress, Best Production Design, Best Ensemble
 Gravity (2013): Best Director, Best Cinematography, Best Production Design
 Her (2013): Best Film, Best Original Screenplay, Best Original Score
 Roma (2018): Best Director, Best Cinematography, Best Foreign Language Film
 Skyfall (2012): Best Supporting Actress, Best Cinematography, Best Original Song
 A Star Is Born (2018): Best Film, Best Supporting Actor, Best Original Song
 12 Years a Slave (2013): Best Actor, Best Supporting Actor, Best Supporting Actress
 2 awards:
 Beasts of the Southern Wild (2012): Best Production Design, Best Original Score
 Boyhood (2014): Best Film, Best Director
 Certified Copy (2011): Best Actress, Best Foreign Film
 Coco (2017): Best Original Song, Best Animated Film
 Dunkirk (2017): Best Cinematography, Best Score
 Get Out (2017): Best Actor, Best Original Screenplay
 Glass Onion: A Knives Out Mystery (2022): Best Adapted Screenplay, Best Ensemble
 The Grand Budapest Hotel (2014): Best Production Design, Best Ensemble
 Inside Out (2015): Best Original Screenplay, Best Animated Film
 The Irishman (2019): Best Supporting Actor, Best Adapted Screenplay
 Little Women (2019): Best Supporting Actress, Best Ensemble
 Moneyball (2011): Best Actor, Best Adapted Screenplay
 Nightcrawler (2014): Best Actor, Best Original Screenplay
 The Power of the Dog (2021): Best Director, Best Adapted Screenplay
 Promising Young Woman (2020): Best Actress, Best Original Screenplay
 One Night in Miami (2020): Best Original Song, Best Ensemble
 Selma (2014): Best Original Song, Oglethorpe Award for Excellence in Georgia Cinema
 Soul (2020): Best Original Score, Best Animated Film
 Sound of Metal (2020): Best Actor, Best Supporting Actor
 Top Gun: Maverick (2022): Best Cinematography, Best Original Song

People with multiple awards
 3 awards:
 Alfonso Cuarón - Best Director: Gravity (2013), Roma (2018); Best Cinematography: Roma (2018)
 Justin Hurwitz - Best Original Score: La La Land (2016), First Man (2018); Best Original Song: La La Land (2016)
 Emmanuel Lubezki - Best Cinematography: The Tree of Life (2011), Gravity (2013), Birdman (2014)
 Hans Zimmer - Best Original Score: Interstellar (2014), Dunkirk (2017), Dune (2021)

 2 awards:
 Mahershala Ali - Best Supporting Actor: Moonlight (2016); Breakthrough Award (2016)
 Bong Joon-ho - Best Director, Best Original Screenplay: Parasite (2019)
 Jane Campion - Best Director, Best Adapted Screenplay: The Power of the Dog (2021)
 Jessica Chastain - Best Supporting Actress: The Tree of Life (2011); Breakthrough Award (2011)
 Damien Chazelle - Best Director, Best Original Screenplay: La La Land (2016)
 Daniels - Best Director, Best Original Screenplay: Everything Everywhere All at Once (2022)
 Roger Deakins - Best Cinematography: Skyfall (2012), 1917 (2019)
 Emerald Fennell - Best Original Screenplay : Promising Young Woman (2020); Breakthrough Award (2020)
 Dennis Gassner - Best Production Design: Blade Runner 2049 (2017), 1917 (2019)
 Alana Haim - Best Actress: Licorice Pizza (2021); Breakthrough Award (2021)
 Lady Gaga - Best Original Song: A Star is Born (2018), Top Gun: Maverick (2022)
 Brie Larson - Breakthrough Award (2013); Best Actress: Room (2015)
 Adam McKay - Best Adapted Screenplay: The Big Short (2015); Oglethorpe Award: Ant-Man (2015)
 Lupita Nyong'o - Best Supporting Actress: 12 Years a Slave (2013); Best Actress: Us (2019)
 Brad Pitt - Best Actor: Moneyball (2011); Best Supporting Actor: The Tree of Life (2011)
 Florence Pugh - Best Supporting Actress: Little Women (2019); Breakthrough Award (2019)
 Stephanie Hsu - Best Supporting Actress: Everything Everywhere All at Once (2022); Breakthrough Award (2022)
 Alicia Vikander - Best Supporting Actress: Ex Machina (2015); Breakthrough Award (2015)
 Steve Zaillian - Best Adapted Screenplay: Moneyball (2011), The Irishman (2019),
 Benh Zeitlin - Best Original Score: Beasts of the Southern Wild (2012); Breakthrough Award (2012)
 Chloé Zhao - Best Director, Best Adapted Screenplay: Nomadland (2020)

References

External links
Georgia Film Critics Association official website

American film critics associations
Organizations based in Atlanta
Organizations established in 2011
Film organizations in the United States
2011 establishments in Georgia (U.S. state)